Victor Serrano may refer to:
Víctor Serrano, Puerto Rican long-distance runner
Victor Serrano (rugby league), French rugby league player